Lergravsparken station is a deep-level Copenhagen Metro station in the East Amager district of Copenhagen, Denmark. It is located on Øresundsvej in a corner of the public park Lergravsparken from which it takes its name. It opened in 2002.

History
Servicing the M2 line, it was the eastern terminus until the extension of the line to Copenhagen Airport was finished in late 2007. It is located in fare zone 1.

Design
The station has bicycle parking facilities.

External links
Lergravsparken station on www.m.dk 
Lergravsparken station on www.m.dk 

M2 (Copenhagen Metro) stations
Railway stations opened in 2002
2002 establishments in Denmark
Railway stations in Denmark opened in the 21st century